Robert Sidey Shaw (July 24, 1871 – February 7, 1953) was president of the Michigan State College of Agriculture and Applied Science (now Michigan State University) from 1928 to 1941. Dormitory Shaw Hall in the center of campus south of the Red Cedar River is named in his honor.  His daughter, Sarah May Shaw, married John A. Hannah, who would succeed Shaw as president of the Michigan State College of Agriculture and Applied Science.

External links
Biographical Information (Michigan State University Archives & Historical Collections)

1871 births
1953 deaths
Presidents of Michigan State University